Ava Inferi was a musical group formed in Almada, Portugal, by Norwegian guitarist and songwriter Rune Eriksen (a.k.a. Blasphemer, Mayhem). Their debut album, Burdens, was released in January 2006.

In the spring of 2007, vocalist Carmen Simões laid vocals on the re-recording of Under Satanæ by Moonspell. In October 2007, the band released their second studio album, called The Silhouette.

In May 2009, the band released their third album, Blood of Bacchus.

In February 2011, the band released their fourth studio album, entitled Onyx.

Rune Eriksen announced the end of Ava Inferi on 23 May 2013.

Band members
 Carmen Susana Simões – vocals
 Rune Eriksen – guitars
 Joana Messias – bass
 André Sobral - guitar

Session members
 Daniel Cardoso (piano)

Discography
 Burdens (2006)
 The Silhouette (2007)
 Blood of Bacchus (2009)
 Onyx (2011)

Music videos

References

External links
 Ava Inferi at Season of Mist

Portuguese gothic metal musical groups
Doom metal musical groups
Portuguese heavy metal musical groups
Musical groups established in 2005
Musical groups disestablished in 2013
Musical quartets
Season of Mist artists